Mercenaries is a basketball club based in Mutare, Zimbabwe. Since 2006, the team has competed in the Manicaland Basketball Association (MBA), winning a league championship in each season.

History
Mercenaries was founded in 2004 by a group of friends from Mutare, led by Innocent Sithole, who hoped to make money playing together in basketball tournaments. In 2006, the club joined the Manicaland Basketball Association (MBA). Since then, it has won 13 consecutive league titles without losing a single game.

In 2019, Mercenaries won its first National Basketball Club Championship, becoming the first team from outside Harare and Bulawayo to do so.

Honours
Zimbabwe National Championship
Champions (1): 2019
Manicaland Basketball Association
Champions (13): 2007, 2008, 2009, 2010, 2011, 2012, 2013, 2014, 2015, 2016, 2017, 2018, 2019

In African competitions
BAL Qualifiers (1 appearance)
2020 – First Round

Personnel

Current roster 
The following is the Mercenaries roster for the 2020 BAL Qualifying Tournaments:

Notable players

 Tatenda Maturure

References

External links
Mercenaries Basketball Club on Twitter

Basketball teams in Zimbabwe
Road to BAL teams
Basketball teams established in 2004
Mutare